Municipal elections were held in the Canadian province of British Columbia on October 20, 2018. Races were held in all municipalities and regional district electoral areas.

Incumbents marked with "(X)".

Selected mayoral and council races were as follows:

Abbotsford

Mayoral election

Abbotsford City Council election
Top 8 candidates elected

Abbotsford City Council By-election 
A by-election was held on September 25, 2021 to replace Bruce Banman who had been elected to the Legislative Assembly of British Columbia.

Armstrong

Mayoral election

Bulkley-Nechako A (Smithers Rural) Electoral Area

Director election

Burnaby

Mayoral election

Burnaby City Council election
Top 8 candidates elected

Burnaby City Council By-election 
A by-election was held on 26 June 2021 to replace Paul McDonnell and Nick Volkow who both died in office.

Top 2 candidates elected

Campbell River

Mayoral election

Cariboo A (Red Bluff - Quesnel South) Electoral Area

Director election

Cariboo G (Lac la Hache - 108 Mile Ranch) Electoral Area

Director election

Castlegar

Mayoral election

Mayoral by-election
A by-election for mayor was held April 24, 2021, following the resignation of Tassone who had been criticized for spending the Christmas holidays in the Okanagan despite travel regulations imposed due to the COVID-19 pandemic in British Columbia.

Central Saanich

Mayoral election

Chilliwack

Mayoral election

Chilliwack City Council election
Top 6 candidates elected

Coldstream

Mayoral election

Columbia-Shuswap C (South Shuswap) Electoral Area

Director election

Colwood

Mayoral election

Comox

Mayoral election

Comox Valley A (Baynes Sound-Denman/Hornby Islands) Electoral Area

Director election

Comox Valley B (Lazo North) Electoral Area

Director election

Comox Valley C (Puntledge - Black Creek) Electoral Area

Director election

Coquitlam

Mayoral election

Coquitlam City Council election
Top 8 candidates elected

Courtenay

Mayoral election

Cowichan Valley B (Shawnigan Lake) Electoral Area

Director election

Cowichan Valley C (Cobble Hill) Electoral Area

Director election

Cranbrook

Mayoral election

Creston

Mayoral election

Dawson Creek

Mayoral election

Delta

Mayoral election

Delta City Council election
Top 6 candidates elected

East Kootenay C Electoral Area

Director election

Esquimalt

Mayoral election

Fernie

Mayoral election

Fort St. John

Mayoral election

Hope

Mayoral election

Kamloops

Mayoral election

Kamloops City Council election
Top 8 candidates elected

Kelowna

Mayoral election

Kelowna City Council election
Top 8 candidates elected

Kent

Mayoral election

Kimberley

Mayoral election

Kitimat

Mayoral election

Ladysmith

Mayoral election

Lake Country

Mayoral election

Langford

Mayoral election

Langley City

Mayoral election

Langley Township

Mayoral election

Langley District Council election
Top 8 candidates elected

Maple Ridge

Mayoral election

Maple Ridge City Council election
Top 6 candidates elected

Merritt

Mayoral election

Metro Vancouver Electoral Area A

Director election

Mission

Mayoral election

Mission District Council election
Top 6 candidates elected

Mayoral by-election
A by-election for mayor was held April 24, 2021 to replace Alexis who had been elected to the BC legislature.

Nanaimo

Mayoral election

Nanaimo City Council election
Top 8 candidates elected

Nanaimo A (South Wellington, Cassidy, Cedar) Electoral Area

Director election

Nanaimo E (Nanoose) Electoral Area

Director election

Nanaimo F (Coombs, Hilliers, Errington) Electoral Area

Director election

Nanaimo G (Dashwood, Englishman River, French Creek) Electoral Area

Director election

Nelson

Mayoral election

New Westminster

Mayoral election

New Westminster City Council election
Top 6 candidates elected

North Cowichan

Mayoral election

North Saanich

Mayoral election

North Vancouver City

Mayoral election

North Vancouver City Council election
Top 6 candidates elected

North Vancouver District

Mayoral election

North Vancouver District Council election
Top 6 candidates elected

Referendums

Oak Bay

Mayoral election

Osoyoos

Mayoral election

Parksville

Mayoral election

Peace River B Electoral Area

Director election

Peace River C Electoral Area

Director election

Peace River D Electoral Area

Director election

Peachland

Mayoral election
After Cindy Fortin and Harry Gough each won 804 votes, Fortin was re-elected when her name was drawn from a box.

Penticton

Mayoral election

Pitt Meadows

Mayoral election

Port Alberni

Mayoral election

Port Coquitlam

Mayoral election

Port Coquitlam City Council election
Top 6 candidates elected

Port Moody

Mayoral election

Powell River

Mayoral election

Prince George

Mayoral election

Prince George City Council election
Top 8 candidates elected

Prince Rupert

Mayoral election

Qualicum Beach

Mayoral election

Quesnel

Mayoral election

Quesnel City Council election 
Top 6 candidates elected

Revelstoke

Mayoral election

Richmond

Mayoral election

Richmond City Council election
Top 8 candidates elected

Richmond School Board Trustees 
 Top 7 candidates elected

Richmond City Council By-election 
A by-election was held on 29 May 2021 to replace Kelly Greene, who has been elected to the BC Legislative Assembly. Independent Andy Hobbs won.

One candidate elected

Saanich

Mayoral election

Saanich District Council election
Top 8 candidates elected

Salmon Arm

Mayoral election

Salt Spring Island Electoral Area

Director election

Sidney

Mayoral election

Sechelt

Mayoral election

Smithers

Mayoral election

Mayoral by-election
A by-election was held on October 17, 2020 to replace Bachrach who was elected to the House of Commons.

Sooke

Mayoral election

Spallumcheen

Mayoral election

Squamish

Mayoral election

Summerland

Mayoral election

Surrey

Mayoral election

Surrey City Council election
Top 8 candidates elected

Terrace

Mayoral election

Trail

Mayoral election

Vancouver

Vernon

Mayoral election

Vernon City Council election
Top 6 candidates elected

Vernon City Council By-election 
A by-election was held on 4 December 2021 to replace Dalvir Nahal who died in December.

Victoria

Mayoral election

Victoria City Council election
Top 8 candidates elected

Referendum

Council by-election
A by-election was held on December 12, 2020 to replace Collins who was elected to the House of Commons.

View Royal

Mayoral election

West Kelowna

Mayoral election

West Vancouver

Mayoral election

West Vancouver District Council election
Top 6 candidates elected

Whistler, British Columbia

Mayoral election

White Rock

Mayoral election

Williams Lake

Mayoral election

References

CivicInfoBC: Results

2018 elections in Canada
Municipal elections in British Columbia
2018 in British Columbia